Joel Eriksson may refer to:

 Joel Eriksson (speed skater) (born 1984), Swedish long track speed skater
 Joel Eriksson (racing driver) (born 1998), Swedish race car driver

See also
 Joel Eriksson Ek, Swedish ice hockey player